Lilium michauxii, commonly known as the Carolina lily, can be found in the southeastern United States from southern Virginia in the north to the Florida Panhandle in the south to eastern Texas in the west.  It is most common in July and August but can be found blooming as late as October. It was named for the French botanist André Michaux, who traveled and did extensive research throughout the Southeast.

The common name "Carolina lily" reflects an older taxonomy that used the name Lilium carolinianum for both L. michauxii and L. catesbaei. Another common name, Turk's cap lily, has been listed for L. michauxii, although L. superbum (which is very similar in appearance to L. michauxii) shares this common name.

The Carolina lily can grow to 3½ feet tall with flowers 3–4 inches across. It is the only fragrant lily east of the Rocky Mountains. Its petals bend backward and are spotted.  Colors range from yellow through orange to red for background petal color and from red through purple to brown for the spots. (Note photo below)

The Carolina lily is the official state wildflower of North Carolina.

References

External links
 Auburn University Wildflower Notes
 Sunlight Gardens

michauxii
Flora of the Southeastern United States
Symbols of North Carolina
Plants described in 1803
Taxa named by André Michaux
Flora without expected TNC conservation status